Cathy Park Hong (born August 7, 1976) is an American poet, writer, and professor who has published three volumes of poetry. Much of her work includes mixed language and serialized narrative. She was named on the 2021 Time 100 list for her writings and advocacy for Asian American women.

Life
Hong, a child of Korean parents, was raised in Los Angeles, California. She graduated from Oberlin College and has an MFA from Iowa Writers' Workshop.

She teaches creative writing at Rutgers University (on leave from Sarah Lawrence College), and is poetry editor for The New Republic.

Hong is married to artist Mores McWreath. They have a daughter named Meret.

Work
Hong is, according to J.P. Eburne's summary of her poetic approach, "dedicated to expanding and experimenting with the capacities of a living art. Her writing, editing, and performances across media seek to open up the 'interactive possibilities' of poetry for the sake of providing 'alternative ways of living within the existing real', as she puts it. 'What are ways in which the poetic praxis can be a ritual for social experimentation? The poem as a public encounter is entrenched in habit. How many ways can we change this encounter?'"

Hong's books of poems include Translating Mo'um (2002), Dance Dance Revolution (2007), and Engine Empire (2012). Her poems have appeared in A Public Space, Paris Review, Poetry, Web Conjunctions, jubilat, and Chain, among others.  She has also written articles for publications like  The Village Voice, The Guardian, The Christian Science Monitor and The New York Times Magazine. In 2002, she won a Pushcart Prize for Translating Mo'um and she won the 2006 Barnard Women Poets Prize. 

She was named on the 2021 Time 100 list for her writings and advocacy for Asian American women.

Dance Dance Revolution
Dance Dance Revolution was Hong's second book, published in 2007 by W.W. Norton. It is a collection of poems, written in a style that encompasses "code-switching", or the mixture of several languages, such as English, Spanish, French and Korean, and spoken extremely informally with the inclusion of slang. The story takes place in an imaginary place called "The Desert", a luxurious place where people of different origins and languages mingle, causing a blend of languages that form into a dialect known in the book as "Desert Creole".

The narrator of Dance Dance Revolution is the Historian, who travels to the Desert to find the woman who her father once loved. "The Guide", a character in the story who acts as the tour guide to the Historian, is that woman. Most of the poems in the book are told from The Guide's point of view, characterized by the Guide's mixture of languages and point of view, with narration of the Historian, which is characterized by the Historian's use of standard English. The Guide uses the poems to talk about her life in the Desert as well as her past during the Kwangju Revolution, when she lived in South Korea before she moved to the Desert.

When asked about the unusual language in the book, Hong commented, "As far as the language, I was reading a lot of linguistic theory at the time, particularly on this idea of Creole as a language that is in transition. French, for instance, was a Creole of Latin before it became the "official" language. English is always in transition, although the Standard version is more likely to be frozen in its glass cube. But spoken, English is a busy traffic of dialects, accents, and slang words going in and out of fashion. Slang is especially fascinating. I love outdated slang dictionaries — these words are artifacts that tell you the mindset and squeamish taboos of a certain milieu during a certain time period. I wanted the English in the book to be a hyperbole of that everyday dynamism of spoken English."

Minor Feelings: An Asian American Reckoning 
Minor Feelings: An Asian American Reckoning, published in 2020 by One World, was Cathy Park Hong's first non-fiction book. It can be considered a memoir and autobiographical to a certain extent. Organized around 7 essays and addressing different acts of racial discrimination, Hong uses her life experiences and feelings to demonstrate what it is like living as part of a marginalized community in the capitalist United States of America. The book was a Pulitzer Prize finalist and won the National Book Critics Circle Award for autobiography.

Awards
 2002 Pushcart Prize for Translating Mo'Um 
 2006 Barnard Women Poets Prize for Dance Dance Revolution
 2018 Windham–Campbell Literature Prize in Poetry
2020 National Book Critics Circle Award for Autobiography

Other awards include a MacDowell Colony Fellowship, Guggenheim, Fulbright, National Endowment for the Arts Fellowship, and New York Foundation for the Arts Fellowships.

Bibliography
 Translating Mo'um, Hanging Loose Press, 2002, 
 Dance Dance Revolution, W. W. Norton, 2007, 
 Engine Empire: Poems, W. W. Norton & Company, 2012, 
 Minor Feelings: An Asian American Reckoning, One World, 2020

Essays
 "Delusions of Whiteness in the Avant-Garde"

References

External links

 cathyparkhong.com
 "Cathy Park Hong on 'Engine Empire'", Paris Review, August 23, 2011, Robyn Creswell
 Interview with Poets & Writers
 Cathy Park Hong reading Zoo from Translating Mo'um
 Review of Translating Mo'um from Rain Taxi
 "Adventures in Shangdu" from Conjunctions
 Protean Woods from jubilat
 "Language Guide" from Action, Yes
 poets.org entry

1976 births
Living people
Oberlin College alumni
American women poets
21st-century American poets
American writers of Korean descent
Iowa Writers' Workshop alumni
Sarah Lawrence College faculty
21st-century American women writers
American women academics